The 2001 Asian Test Championship was a Test cricket tournament held in Sri Lanka and Pakistan in August 2001. It was a tri-nation series between the national representative cricket teams of the Sri Lanka, Bangladesh and Pakistan, where India did not participated to the series. The hosts Sri Lanka won the tournament by defeating Pakistan by 8 wickets in the final.

Squads

Matches

1st Test

2nd Test

Final

References

External links
 Series home at ESPN Cricinfo

2001 in Sri Lankan cricket
2001 in Pakistani cricket
2001 in Bangladeshi cricket
International cricket competitions in 2001–02